Abdul Sattar Rajper is a Pakistani politician who was a Member of the Provincial Assembly of Sindh from 2008 to May 2018.

Early life and education
He was born on 1 January 1960 in Naushahro Feroze District.

He has a MBBS degree from Liaquat Medical College in Jamshoro.

Political career
He was elected to the Provincial Assembly of Sindh as a candidate of Pakistan Peoples Party (PPP) from Constituency PS-22 (Naushero Feroze-IV) in 2008 Pakistani general election. He received 34,793 votes and defeated Abdul Sattar Abbasi, a candidate of National Peoples Party (NPP).

He was re-elected to the Provincial Assembly of Sindh as a candidate of PPP from Constituency PS-22 Naushahro Feroze-IV in 2013 Pakistani general election. He received 30,124 votes and defeated Arif Mustafa Jatoi, a candidate of NPP.

References

Living people
Sindh MPAs 2013–2018
1960 births
Pakistan People's Party politicians
Sindh MPAs 2008–2013